The Gorilla Foundation is a non-profit organization founded in 1976 by Francine Patterson
and Ronald Cohn in order to purchase the young gorilla named Koko from the San Francisco Zoo. Patterson had been teaching Koko American Sign Language since 1972, under custody of the zoo. In 1974, Patterson moved the project from a trailer at the zoo to a new compound at Stanford University, yet there was a possibility that Koko would need to be returned to the zoo, so Patterson raised money to buy and keep her. After the purchase, the foundation continued to support Patterson's research as she worked with Koko, in order to research language acquisition by non-human animals.

Besides Koko, the foundation also kept two male gorillas: Michael from 1976 until his death in 2000, and Ndume from 1991 until his return to the Cincinnati Zoo in 2019. Koko died in 2018, and after her death followed by the transfer of Ndume, the foundation no longer had any gorillas on which to conduct research.

Beginning 
Patterson had worked with Koko since 1972, when she began teaching the then 1-year-old gorilla American Sign Language (ASL). Patterson planned to continue her scientific experiment designed to determine whether, if it were raised using sign language, a gorilla would learn to use language.

Patterson fed and cared for Koko as she would her own child, and the pair formed a mother/child emotional bond. Koko was first moved from the San Francisco Children's Zoo to a private trailer on the zoo in 1973, and then moved to a campus at Stanford University in 1974. After purchasing Koko, the foundation moved her into a trailer near Patterson's home in Woodside, California. In 1976, The Gorilla Foundation acquired Michael, a gorilla born in Cameroon who was allegedly orphaned after his parents were killed for meat, as a potential language-using mate for Koko.

Activities
Patterson and her assistants used simultaneous spoken English and ASL when speaking with the gorillas. Patterson has published several papers claiming that Koko has developed a vocabulary of 1000 to 2000 words and that Koko has invented words and compound words. Under Patterson's criterion for acquisition of a language term, which must be "recorded by two independent observers and be used spontaneously and appropriately on at least half the days of a given month", Koko had learned 264 signs in the first five and a half years of training.

Beginning in the 1990s, the Foundation tried to raise money to move their operation from its sole location in Woodside, California, to a new ape preserve in Maui. They hoped that Koko would successfully mate with her partner, Ndume, who had arrived in 1991, and spontaneously teach their offspring to use sign language.

In 2018 Koko died, activating a section of Ndume's loan agreement with the Cincinnati Zoo, which said that Ndume would be placed in an "Association of Zoos and Aquariums" institution after Koko's death. Patterson tried to prevent the move, citing concerns about Ndume's health, which led to a lawsuit resulting in Ndume's removal in June 2019.

According to the Foundation's website, Patterson and other employees have partnered with conservation organizations including International Fund for Animal Welfare and Pan African Conservation Education. The Gorilla Foundation has attempted education projects to decrease the consumption of bushmeat. The Gorilla Foundation is still working toward a great ape sanctuary on Maui.

Criticism
During a question-and-answer period, in response to a question as to whether her findings would ever be scientifically proven by duplicating them in an independent experiment, Patterson stated that she believes it would not be ethical to do it again because she believes that it is not right to keep such animals in such unnatural circumstances.

Patterson was accused of sexual discrimination in 2005 by reportedly expecting female volunteers to show their breasts to Koko. This led to a lawsuit, during which said volunteers were fired.

Whether the gorillas actually learned language is debated. Some researchers and linguists have said that most of the signs they used were used chaotically in order to meet a goal, without regard for sentence structure, making them not true language. However, the differences between sign languages and spoken languages have been used to help understand the gorillas' language acquisition, and Koko has been described as using language in advanced ways, such as symbolic descriptions, lying, and making jokes.

See also
 Gorilla
 Great ape language
 Koko (gorilla)
Michael (gorilla)
Ndume
 Koko: A Talking Gorilla (1978 documentary)

References

External links
The Gorilla Foundation official site

Organizations established in 1976
Primate conservation
Redwood City, California
1976 establishments in California
Non-profit organizations based in the San Francisco Bay Area